From 1948 to 1972, under the Ceylon Independence Act of 1947, the head of state was the Monarch of the United Kingdom who was represented in Ceylon by a Governor-General. Ceylon became a republic under the Constitution of 1972 and the Monarch and Governor-General were replaced by a ceremonial President. Since 1978, under the current constitution, the President has executive powers, becoming both head of state and government.

Monarch (1948–1972)
From 1948 to 1972 the head of state of Ceylon was the same person as the Monarch of the United Kingdom. The Governor-General of Ceylon exercised the duties of the head of state.

Governors-General

President of Sri Lanka

Under the 1972 Constitution of the Republic of Sri Lanka, the President replaced the Monarch as a ceremonial head of state. The President was elected by the National Assembly for a six-year term. In the event of a vacancy, the Prime Minister served as Acting President.

In 1978 Constitution the Presidency became an executive post, otherwise all other the rules were the same as in the 1972 Constitution.

Status

Standards

References

External links
 World Statesmen – Sri Lanka
  Rulers.org – Sri Lanka

Government of Sri Lanka
H

Sri Lanka